Fan Baiqun (Chinese: 范柏群; born 18 February 1986) is a Chinese football player who currently plays for Zhejiang Greentown in the China League One.

Club career
In 2005, Fan Baiqun started his professional footballer career with Tianjin Teda in the Chinese Super League. He eventually made his Super League debut for Tianjin on 30 March 2008 in a game against Hangzhou Greentown. In February 2012, Fan was loaned to China League One side Shenyang Shenbei until 31 December. In January 2013, Fan was loaned to another League One club Tianjin Songjiang for one year. Tianjin Songjiang extended his loan deal for one year in December 2013.

On 25 January 2017, Fan moved to League Two side Sichuan Longfor.  On 31 January 2018, Fan transferred to China League One side Zhejiang Greentown.

Career statistics 
Statistics accurate as of match played 31 December 2020.

References

External links
 

1987 births
Living people
Chinese footballers
Footballers from Tianjin
Tianjin Jinmen Tiger F.C. players
Tianjin Tianhai F.C. players
Sichuan Longfor F.C. players
Zhejiang Professional F.C. players
Chinese Super League players
China League One players
Association football midfielders